In taxonomy, Stetteria is a genus of the Desulfurococcaceae. Up to now there is only one species of this genus known (Stetteria hydrogenophila).

References

Further reading

Scientific journals

Scientific books

Scientific databases

External links

Archaea genera
Monotypic genera
Thermoproteota